The 1154 papal election followed the death of Pope Anastasius IV and resulted in the election of Pope Adrian IV, the only Englishman to become pope.

Election of Adrian IV
Pope Anastasius IV died on 3 December 1154 in Rome, at a very advanced age. The College of Cardinals assembled in the Vatican Basilica on the next day to elect his successor.
On 4 December 1154 the cardinals unanimously elected Cardinal-Bishop of Albano Nicholas Breakspeare, former legate in Scandinavia (1152–1153). He took the name Adrian IV and was crowned on 5 December 1154 in the Vatican Basilica. He is the only English pope in history.

Cardinal-electors
There were probably 30 cardinals in the Sacred College of Cardinals at the beginning of December 1154, but it seems that no more than 25 (perhaps even fewer) participated in the election:

Five electors were created by Pope Innocent II, four by Pope Celestine II, five by Pope Lucius II, eleven by Pope Eugenius III.

Absentees
At least five cardinals did not participate in this election. Cardinal Giacinto Bobone is known to have been in Spain at that time; he served there as papal legate from the spring of 1154 until the end of 1155. Cardinal Odone Bonecase was employed as legate in France in 1154/55. Gerard de Namur was legate in Germany, while Ildebrando in Lombardy. Abbot Rainaldo of Montecassino was not a resident of Roman Curia:

Notes

Sources
Salvador Miranda Papal election of 1154

12th-century elections
1154
1154
1154 in Europe
12th-century Catholicism
Pope Adrian IV